Robert Geroch (born 1 June 1942 in Akron, Ohio) is an American theoretical physicist and professor at the University of Chicago. He has worked prominently on general relativity and mathematical physics and has promoted the use of category theory in mathematics and physics. He was the Ph.D. supervisor for Abhay Ashtekar, Basilis Xanthopoulos and Gary Horowitz. He also proved an important theorem in spin geometry.

Education
Geroch obtained his Ph.D. degree from Princeton University in 1967 under the supervision of John Archibald Wheeler, with a thesis on Singularities in the spacetime of general relativity: their definition, existence, and local characterization.

Writings

Chapters 

Geroch R.P. (1977) "Asymptotic Structure of Space-Time", p.1--105 in: Esposito F.P., Witten L. (eds) Asymptotic Structure of Space-Time. Springer, Boston, MA. 

Horowitz, G.T and Geroch, R.P. (1979) "Global structure of spacetimes", p.212--293. In Hawking S.W. and Israel, W (eds): General Relativity: An Einstein Centenary Survey. Cambridge University Press 1979

Articles 

Geroch, R.P. (1966) "Singularities in closed universes," Phys.Rev.Lett. 17 (1966) 445--447. 
Geroch, R.P. (1967) "Topology in general relativity," J.Math.Phys. 8, 782--786.  

Geroch, R.P. (1970) "Multipole Moments. I. Flat Space" J.Math.Phys. 11, (1970), 1955-1961. 
Geroch, R.P. (1970) "The Domain of Dependence," J.Math.Phys. 11 (1970) 437--439.  
Geroch, R.P. (1971) "Space-time structure from a global viewpoint," Rend. Scu. Int. Fis. Enrico Fermi 47: 71-103(1971); in B.K.Sachs, ed. , General Relativity and Cosmology (New York, Academic Press, 1971). 
Geroch, R.P. (1971) "A Method for generating solutions of Einstein's equations," J.Math.Phys. 12 (1971) 918--924. 
Geroch, R.P. (1972) "A Method for generating solutions of Einstein's equations. 2.," J.Math.Phys. 13 (1972) 394--404. 

Geroch, R.P. (1972), "Einstein algebras," Comm. Math. Phys., 26 (4), 271--275. 

Geroch, R.P., Kronheimer,  E.H., and Penrose, R. (1972) "Ideal points in space-time," Proc. R. Soc. Lond. A327, 545--567. 

Ashtekar, A. and Geroch, R.P. (1974), "Quantum theory of gravitation", Rept. Prog. Phys., 37, 1211--1256.

Books

Unpublished notes 
 Course Notes, Problem Sets, and Short Topics, for Lecture courses at the University of Chicago, primarily in the 1970s.
 Suggestions For Giving Talks, Notes on giving scientific talks, 1973. Available at: arXiv:gr-qc/9703019

See also 

 Geroch energy
 Geroch group
 Geroch's splitting theorem
 GHP formalism

Notes

External links 
Faculty page at the University of Chicago (2016-09-19 version via Internet Archive)
Robert Geroch research articles cited by INSPIRE-HEP
Robert Geroch research articles cited by arXiv

Living people
21st-century American physicists
American relativity theorists
Princeton University alumni
University of Chicago faculty
1942 births
People from Akron, Ohio
20th-century American mathematicians
Mathematicians from Ohio
Mathematical physicists